Schwanthalerhöhe is a Munich U-Bahn station in Munich on the U4 and U5 of the Munich U-Bahn system.

See also
List of Munich U-Bahn stations

References

Munich U-Bahn stations
Railway stations in Germany opened in 1984
1984 establishments in West Germany